Thaleops is an extinct genus of trilobite of the family Illaenidae. It lived from the Floian to the Katian of the Ordovician in what is now North America.
Thaleops can be told apart from other illaenids because of the cheek spines that many species possess under their eyes. Thaleops had a large distribution range, With some species being found in parts of Canada to some U.S states including Oklahoma, Wisconsin, and New York. It is thought to have lived in shallow water, as a study published in Oklahoma found that deposits that contained Thaleops and the  asaphid trilobite Bumastides contained 4 times as many trilobite genera, where associated with shallow water areas.

Classification

Classification of Thaleops, Illaenus, and Nanillaenus by Amati & Westrop, 2004.

 Thaleops

References

Trilobite genera
Trilobites of North America
Ordovician trilobites
Illaenina